Johnston Marklee & Associates, is an architecture firm in Los Angeles, California founded by Sharon Johnston and her husband Mark Lee in 1998.

They are known for their "subtle" and "quietly innovative" approach to modern design. The firm was listed in the 2019 AD100 list of top architects and designers by Architectural Digest, and was named the 2016 Oliver Fellows for Architecture & Design.

See also
 List of architecture firms

References

Architecture firms based in California
Design companies established in 1998
1998 establishments in California
American companies established in 1998
Companies based in Los Angeles